Naghsh-e-Jahan Stadium (Varzešgâh-è Naqš-è Jahân, meaning Image of the World Stadium), is a football stadium in Isfahan, Iran. It has been the home stadium of Sepahan between its completion in 2003 and 2007, and again since its reopening in 2016. With a current seating capacity of 75,000 it is the second largest stadium in Iran. 

It has hosted four Hazfi Cup finals in 2004, 2006, 2007 and 2021.

Attendance record
The following table lists six matches with the most attendance at Naghsh-e-Jahan Stadium (More than 38,000 attendances).

Other facilities

Naghsh-e-Jahan Arena
Naghsh-e-Jahan Arena officially named 25 Aban Arena is an indoor sports arena in Isfahan. The stadium has a seating capacity of 6,000. It is mainly used for volleyball, futsal and wrestling. The arena hosted the 2015 AFC Futsal Club Championship and 2017 World Men's Greco-Roman Wrestling Clubs' Cup.

See also
Sepahan S.C.
Naghsh-e-Jahan square
Naghsh-e-Jahan derby

References

External links

Football venues in Iran
Buildings and structures in Isfahan
Sepahan S.C.
Multi-purpose stadiums in Iran
Sport in Isfahan
Sports venues completed in 2003
2003 establishments in Iran